Deh-e Salman or Deh Salman may refer to:
 Deh-e Salman, Lorestan
 Deh-e Salman, Markazi